Dišem za tebe is the sixth studio album of Montenegrin singer Šako Polumenta, which was released in 2002.

Track listing 
 Eh kad bi ti
 E što nisam sunce 
 Sve je laž
 Vino i ljubav
 Uz mene godinama
 Dišem za tebe
 Nižu se pjesme
 Daj mi malo vremena
 Brate...?
 Sine moj
 Te oči

2002 albums
Šako Polumenta albums